No One Here Gets Out Alive (1980) was the first biography about Jim Morrison, lead singer and lyricist of the L.A. rock band the Doors. Its title is taken from the Doors song "Five to One", and the book is divided into three sections: The Bow is Drawn, The Arrow Flies and The Arrow Falls, for the early years of Morrison's life, his rise to fame with the Doors, and then his final years and death. The book was written by Jerry Hopkins and Danny Sugerman.

A companion video was made featuring interviews with the surviving members of the Doors, Hopkins, Sugerman and Paul A. Rothchild among others. It includes some rare footage and was the first video released by the band. It helped rekindle interest in the Doors by allowing fans that were too young or unable to remember, to see the Doors in action.

No One Here Gets Out Alive was accused by some people for some historical inaccuracies, and the authors' views surrounding Morrison's death. Among those people were Rothchild who claimed that Danny Sugerman had changed some of his statements while he was interviewed by Jerry Hopkins. Guitarist Robby Krieger said in response of the book that Danny Sugerman "had his own ideas about what happened and various situations. He kind of put his own words into it, and what really annoyed me was that he tried to make Jim sound like was talking through Danny, and it wasn't the way Jim really was."

Background
Published nearly a decade after Morrison's death by journalist Jerry Hopkins, the first draft was written solely by Hopkins, based on extensive interviews with Morrison. But attempts to find a publisher during the years when the Doors were no longer popular, met with rejections from all major publishing houses. Ten years later, the second version of the manuscript, with additional sensationalistic content, added by Danny Sugerman, was what made it into publication. 

The book's publication, following the 1978 release of Morrison's posthumous spoken word album (with music by the Doors) An American Prayer, the prominent use of Doors music on the 1979 soundtrack for the film Apocalypse Now, and the 1980 release of the band's Greatest Hits album, all combined to bring the Doors and Morrison back into the popular culture.

References

Publication data
 No One Here Gets Out Alive (1980), Jerry Hopkins and Danny Sugerman
 1980 Plexus Publishing hardcover: 
 1980 Plexus Publishing paperback: 
 1991 Plexus Publishing hardcover: 
 1991 Plexus Publishing paperback: 
 updated 1995 Warner mass market paperback: 
 1995 Time Warner AudioBook: 
 1997 Barnes & Noble edition: 

1980 non-fiction books
Jim Morrison
Biographies about musicians